Kentucky Route 28 (KY 28) is a  state highway in the U.S. state of Kentucky that travels from KY 11 and KY 30 in Booneville to KY 15 in northern rural Perry County via Cow Creek, Arnett, Buckhorn, and Chavies. KY 28 begins in Booneville by traveling concurrently with KY 30 east while KY 30 west travels through town to the northwest. KY 30 veers off at the official beginning of KY 28 at Mulberry Street. KY 28 heads out of Booneville in Owsley County, heading southeast. After about  through Breathitt County, KY 28 enters Perry County. KY 28 passes through the community of Buckhorn before making a short reentry into Breathitt County. After returning to Perry County, KY 28 passes through the community of Chavies before ending at KY 15 at Grapevine in Perry County.

Major intersections

Owsley County + Breathitt County = 18.154

See also

References

0028
0028
0028
0028